Alcides Catanho (born January 20, 1972) is a former American football linebacker in the National Football League for the New England Patriots and the Washington Redskins. He played high school football at Elizabeth High School and college football at Rutgers University. He is married to Kara Catanho, with whom he has two children, a daughter and a son. Kara Catanho works in WWMS, a school in Edison, NJ as a health and physical education teacher.

References

1972 births
Living people
American football linebackers
Elizabeth High School (New Jersey) alumni
New England Patriots players
Sportspeople from Elizabeth, New Jersey
Rutgers Scarlet Knights football players
Washington Redskins players
Players of American football from New Jersey